Lieutenant General Charles Osborne Creagh-Osborne CB (20 December 1823 – 17 August 1892) was a British Army officer who became Commandant of the Staff College, Sandhurst.

Military career
Creagh-Osborne was commissioned as an ensign into the 6th Regiment of Foot in 1841. He served with the Scinde Camel Corps during Sir Charles Napier's campaign in India in 1842. He also took part in the response to Indian Mutiny of 1857 being present at the assault on Jagdispur. He became Superintendent of Garrison Instructors in India in 1873 and Commandant of the Staff College, Sandhurst in 1878. There is a memorial to him in Boldre Churchyard.

Family
In 1866 he married Harriet Frances Crozier; they had three sons and three daughters.

References

1823 births
1892 deaths
British Army lieutenant generals
Companions of the Order of the Bath
Royal Warwickshire Fusiliers officers
Commandants of the Staff College, Camberley
British military personnel of the Indian Rebellion of 1857